

The Walter Sisulu National Botanical Garden (previously known as the Witwatersrand National Botanical Garden) is a  botanical reserve in Roodepoort near Johannesburg. Formally established in 1982, it is one of the youngest of South Africa's National Botanical Gardens, but the site where it is located has been popular with visitors for many decades before that. The garden is home to a well known pair of Verreaux's eagles that nest in the Roodekrans ridge which intersects the reserve. The garden has a restaurant, gift shop and nursery which sells South African native plants (the nursery closed March 2015). The Garden has been recognised as one of the most beautiful botanical gardens in the world.

See also 
List of botanical gardens in South Africa

References

External links 

 South African National Biodiversity Institute
 Walter Sisulu National Botanical Garden Homepage

Parks in Johannesburg
Botanical gardens in South Africa